(born 26 December 1966) is Japanese manga artist from Sakata, Yamagata Prefecture.

Two of his works, Bambi and Her Pink Gun and Soil, have been published in French. Bambi and Her Pink Gun has also been published in English. Soil has been adapted into a television drama series.

Works
Bambi and Her Pink Gun (1998)
Soil (2004)
Wet Moon (2011)
Deathco (2014)
Evol (2020)

References

External links

Interview at Arte.tv 
Documentary portrait of Atsushi Kaneko

1966 births
Living people
Manga artists from Yamagata Prefecture